The 2022 Nevada lieutenant gubernatorial election occurred on November 8, 2022, to elect the lieutenant governor of the state of Nevada. The election will coincide with various other federal and state elections, including for Governor of Nevada. Primary elections are to be held on June 14. Nevada is one of 21 states that elects its lieutenant governor separately from its governor.

Incumbent Democratic Lieutenant Governor Lisa Cano Burkhead was appointed by Governor Steve Sisolak on December 16, 2021, to succeed Kate Marshall, who resigned to join the Biden administration. She lost in her bid for a full term, to Republican candidate Stavros Anthony.

Background
Kate Marshall was first elected as lieutenant governor in 2018 with 50.4% of the vote against Michael Roberson, who was minority leader of the Nevada State Senate at the time. After serving for two years, on September 17, 2021, she resigned from the position to work in the White House Office of Intergovernmental Affairs. After roughly three months of the seat being vacant, school teacher, principal, and former candidate for the Nevada Assembly Lisa Cano Burkhead was appointed in December 2021.

Democratic primary

Background
Kimi Cole, the Chair of the Nevada Rural Democratic Caucus, was the first Democratic candidate to announce their candidacy on November 12, 2021. She gained attention by some due to the fact that she's transgender, and, if elected, would be the first statewide elected transgender official in the United States. Henderson mayor Debra March would announce her candidacy a few weeks later, on November 24, 2021, being the only one to have been elected to public office. Lisa Cano Burkhead, the appointed Lieutenant Governor, announced her candidacy on December 16, 2021. By the end of the year, March led with a sizable lead in terms of fundraising, raising over $380,000 by the end of 2021, with Burkhead in second at nearly $78,000, and Cole in a distant third at just under $34,000

Candidates

Nominee
 Lisa Cano Burkhead, incumbent lieutenant governor

Eliminated in primary
 Eva Chase, MGM Resorts International employee
 Kimi Cole, chair of Nevada Rural Democratic Caucus
 Debra March, mayor of Henderson

Endorsements

Results

Republican primary

Candidates

Nominee
 Stavros Anthony, Las Vegas city councilor

Eliminated in primary
 Tony Grady Jr., U.S. Air Force pilot
 M. Kameron Hawkins, founder of Hawkins for Nevada Foundation and activist
 John Miller
 Mack Miller, business consultant and candidate for Nevada State Assembly in 2020
 Peter Pavone, businessman and entertainer

Endorsements

Polling

Results

Independents and third-party candidates

Candidates

Nominees
 John "Trey" Delap (Independent), nonprofit group consultant
William Hoge (Independent American), former Republican California state assemblyman (1992–1996) and Independent candidate for Nevada State Treasurer in 2018
 Javi "Trujillo" Tachiquin (Libertarian), MMA fighter

General election

Endorsements

Polling

Results

Notes

Partisan clients

References

External links
Official campaign websites
 Stavros Anthony (R) for Lieutenant Governor
 Lisa Cano Burkhead (D) for Lieutenant Governor
 Trey Delap (Nonpartisan) for Lieutenant Governor

Lieutenant gubernatorial
Nevada
Nevada lieutenant gubernatorial elections